Mohimabad (also Romanized as Mohīmābād) is a village in Abreis Rural District, Bazman District, Iranshahr County, Sistan and Baluchestan Province, Iran. At the 2006 census, its population was 24, in 5 families.

References 

Populated places in Iranshahr County